The Nashville Diamonds were an American soccer club based in Nashville, Tennessee that was a member of the American Soccer League. Their home stadium was Hale Stadium on the campus of Tennessee State University, then the home of the Tennessee State Tigers football team.

Owner
 Ralph Woerheide

1982 Roster
 Fred Armstrong 12 Apps 0 Goals 
 Rich Finneyfrock 
 Godwin Iwelumo 
 Brian McInerney 13 Apps 0 Goals 
 Franklin Lawson 
 Issac Moushi 
 Armando Pelaez 
 Tony Rowshanaei 
 Bret Simon 
 Kurt Swanbeck 
 Kirk Gilbert 8 Games 3 Goals

Year-by-year

References

Sports in Nashville, Tennessee
Defunct soccer clubs in Tennessee
American Soccer League (1933–1983) teams
1982 establishments in Tennessee
1982 disestablishments in Tennessee
Soccer clubs in Tennessee
Association football clubs established in 1982
Association football clubs disestablished in 1982